is a railway station in Uonuma, Niigata, Japan, operated by East Japan Railway Company (JR East).

Lines

Station layout
The station consists of one ground-level side platform  serving a single bi-directional track. The station is unattended.

History 
The station was absorbed into the JR East network upon the privatization of the JNR on April 1, 1987.

Surrounding area
Uonuma-Tanaka Post Office
Japan National Route 252

See also
 List of railway stations in Japan

References

External links
  Uonuma-Tanaka Station (JR East)

Railway stations in Niigata Prefecture
Stations of East Japan Railway Company
Railway stations in Japan opened in 1951
Tadami Line